Mano is an ethnic group of Liberia. The group speaks the Mano language, which belongs to the Mande language family.

Mano people in Liberia 
The Mano ethnic group occupy the northeastern part of Liberia known as Nimba County and some parts of modern day Guinea , in the forest section of that republic. According to John Gbatu, (1919-2010), a prominent Mano tribal leader, the name Nimba originates with the Mano dialect which in Mano is Niemba Tun. The meaning is "hills on which young maidens will slip and fall".

This is so because the Mano used to worship their god up what is today known as Mt. Nimba in Liberia. They occupied major cities and towns in Niemba such as Ganta, Yekepa, Sanniquellie, and Scalepea amongst others.

According to Stanley Delano Quaye (1985-), a Liberian Historical Economist and Banker and grandson of John Gbatu, the Mano belongs to the Mande speaking group and has had a long history. He narrated that the tribe migrated from Sudan and settled in the Mali empire and subsequently to the republic of Guinea where they formed a Kingdom in the Youmou area. They later migrated to what is Liberia during the term of the thirteenth and fourteenth centuries, a larger portion arrived during the turn of the sixteenth and seventeen centuries.

Stanley Delano Quaye has done research in anthropology and the political structure of the Mano and Gio tribes. His noted paper discusses the political and economic governance of the tribes. The Manos are also warriors and excellent in the arts and crafts. In modern day Liberia, they occupy positions in national government, banking and engineering.  They are among Liberia's best doctors and engineers.

Origins 
The mano alongside their Gio (Dan) brothers descend from the Mandé peoples. They subsequently emigrated from the Mali empire and traveled to Mano/Dan land part of present day Liberia  Guinea and Cote D'Ivoire at the turn of the 16th and 17th centuries. They helped defend the empire against invaders from mainly North Africa. The Mano have two traditional schools: the poro for men and the sande for women.

As Christianity spread to Northern Liberia during the 19th century, many Mano abandoned their traditional practices and took to western religious groups such as the Methodist and Catholic churches. Dr. George Way Harley, a missionary from the United States settled in Ganta and started the Ganta United Mission which later grew to high schools, hospitals and colleges (the mission station now houses the Winifred J. Harley School of Nursing named after his wife). Dr. Harley was also amused by the Mano culture mask ceremony.  He bought many masks from the locals and established a museum in Cleveland, United States. He died on November 7, 1966. His ashes were flown to Ganta to be buried near the mission station having spent over 35 years in Ganta.

The Mano are excellent in arts and crafts; they are also gifted musicians and farmers. Mano are also in Guinea; it is common to see Mano towns in Guinea to have similar names cultures with that of their Liberian brothers. This is why during the Liberian Civil War, most Liberian Manos were welcomed and treated with great pity and hospitality by their Guineans brothers. In fact, during the great siege of Ganta, high ranking Manos in the Guinean Army provided military aid to Mano defenders in Liberia.

Today, the region they occupied have common bustling towns in terms of trade and commerce mainly by their Dan brothers. The Manos have close culture and language similarity with the Gios (Dan). They are the two major tribes in Nimba county.

References 

 
Ethnic groups in Liberia